Liesbeth Vernout (born 1958) is a Dutch former cricketer. She played eight Women's One Day International matches for the Netherlands women's national cricket team. She was part of the Netherlands squad for the 1988 Women's Cricket World Cup.

References

External links
 

1958 births
Living people
Dutch women cricketers
Netherlands women One Day International cricketers
Place of birth missing (living people)
20th-century Dutch women
21st-century Dutch women